The Kline Farmhouse, also known as Cold Spring Cottage, is located on a  farm along County Route 517 (Old Turnpike Road), north of Oldwick in Tewksbury Township of Hunterdon County, New Jersey. Built by Jacob Kline in the 1790s, it was added to the National Register of Historic Places on July 11, 1984, for its significance in agriculture, architecture and settlement. Also known as the Beavers House, it was previously documented by the Historic American Buildings Survey in 1966. It was later listed as a contributing property of the Oldwick Historic District in 1988.

History and description
The farmhouse was built in the 1790s by Jacob Kline, an elder at the Zion Lutheran Church in Oldwick and a county freeholder. The one and one-half story frame building overlooks a spring that feeds the Cold Brook, a tributary of the Lamington River. After Kline died in 1823, the property was sold to Joseph Bartles and Benjamin Van Doren, husbands of two of his daughters.

See also
 National Register of Historic Places listings in Hunterdon County, New Jersey
 Bartles House

References

External links
 
 

Tewksbury Township, New Jersey
Farmhouses in the United States
Houses in Hunterdon County, New Jersey
National Register of Historic Places in Hunterdon County, New Jersey
Houses on the National Register of Historic Places in New Jersey
New Jersey Register of Historic Places
Historic American Buildings Survey in New Jersey
Historic district contributing properties in New Jersey
Historic district contributing properties in Hunterdon County, New Jersey
Individually listed contributing properties to historic districts on the National Register in New Jersey